Indongo is a Namibian surname. Notable people with the surname include:

Frans Indongo (born 1936), Namibian businessman and politician
Julius Indongo (born 1983), Namibian professional boxer

Surnames of African origin